The women's hammer throw at the 2021 World Athletics U20 Championships was held at the Kasarani Stadium on 20 and 21 August.

Records

Results

Qualification
The qualification took place on 20 August, in two groups, with Group A starting at 09:08 and Group B starting at 10:05. Athletes attaining a mark of at least 60.00 metres ( Q ) or at least the 12 best performers ( q ) qualified for the final.

Final
The final was held on 21 August at 16:26.

References

Hammer throw women
Hammer throw at the World Athletics U20 Championships
U20